Gun laws in Rhode Island regulate the sale, possession, and use of firearms and ammunition in the U.S. state of Rhode Island.

Summary table

State constitutional provisions
Article I, Section 22 of the Constitution of Rhode Island states: "The right of the people to keep and bear arms shall not be infringed."

Permitting system
Rhode Island is a hybrid shall/may issue state.  The "local licensing authority" of each town (police chief or town council if the locality has no police force) is given the authority to grant carry licenses for concealed carry only on a shall-issue basis but until recently, many police chiefs and town officials had refused to issue. Often an applicant will be referred to the attorney general which is a "may issue" licensing authority and whose issued permit also allows for open carry.  In practice, carry permits have been very hard to obtain from the Attorney General's Office under their strict interpretation of "proper showing of need", which has only become stricter under the current Neronha administration who will only issue to those who can prove a specific threat to the applicant's life, have a work related purpose (security guard) or are a former police officer.

However, the "shall" nature of the applicable statute is confusing, stating that the applicant should have "good reason to fear an injury to his or her person or property or has any other proper reason for carrying a pistol or revolver".  Some local police chiefs disregard the "other proper reason" clause and require a letter of need.  Most local police chiefs also use the AG's application (which does require need) and thus the chiefs simply follow suit. These towns have been known to require additional requirements that are not included in state law such as attending a firearm safety course, acquiring notarized reference letters, and re-qualifying with the caliber you wish to carry every time you renew. State law does however require an applicant for either permit to pass a skill test using the Army-L target at 25 yards, to be certified by a police official or an NRA Certified Instructor.  In most cases, the AG will not issue a permit unless the demonstrated need is extremely convincing (work purposes, threat to one's life, etc.).  Upon denial, applicants are offered the opportunity to appeal, requiring an interview with Bureau of Criminal Investigation staff. This often results in the issuance of a restricted permit, often for target range use.  However, state law does not grant the AG the authority to issue restricted permits and state law explicitly states that carrying a firearm to a target range does not require a permit.

Recent Developments in license to carry policies 
In April 2015, the Rhode Island Supreme Court ruled that local police chiefs must issue licenses to carry to qualified applicants (e.g., those who pass a background check and complete the required firearms skill training).  The ruling further states that local issuing authorities must "show cause" if an applicant is denied a permit to carry, and that simply stating the applicant is "not suitable" without substantive justification is no longer a valid reason for the denial of a carry license. 

In June 2022, the United States Supreme Court ruled in New York State Rifle & Pistol Association, Inc. v. Bruen that the proper cause requirement in New York law for concealed pistol licenses was unconstitutional. In response, Rhode Island Attorney General Peter Neronha issued a statement stating that Rhode Island was already in compliance with the Bruen decision since current Rhode Island law already requires local authorities to issue on a "shall-issue" basis as required by Bruen. He additionally stated that since Rhode Islanders have a method of acquiring concealed carry licenses without a showing of need or proper cause, he could continue requiring a "showing of need" for carry permits issued by his office therefore making it still difficult for individuals to obtain a carry permit to open carry in Rhode Island. As permits issued by local authorities apply to concealed carry only. 

Non-resident permits can be issued by both the Attorney General's office and the local authorities of any town or city under 11–47–11, however, many localities refuse to issue to anyone who does not reside within their city or town, and instead direct them to the Attorney General in violation of state law.

Castle law
Rhode Island has a moderately strong castle law, limited to the inside of a dwelling, with no duty to retreat.

Red flag law
Under the state's red flag law, the police may petition the Superior Court to issue an extreme risk protection order if they receive credible information of a significant and imminent risk. A judge may issue a temporary gun-removal order, but a hearing is required within 14 days to determine if a one-year ban on buying or possessing a firearms is warranted.

Waiting period
After purchasing a firearm, the waiting period before the buyer can take possession is 7 days, unless the buyer is a law enforcement officer or possesses a locally issued concealed carry permit.

References

Rhode Island law
Rhode Island